Donald Johnson and Gustavo Kuerten were the defending champions but only Johnson competed that year with Jared Palmer.

Johnson and Palmer lost in the semifinals to Bob Bryan and Mike Bryan.

The Bryan brothers won in the final 6–1, 3–6, [10–2] against Martin Damm and David Rikl.

Seeds

  Donald Johnson /  Jared Palmer (semifinals)
  Martin Damm /  David Rikl (final)
  Bob Bryan /  Mike Bryan (champions)
  David Adams /  Martín García (first round)

Draw

External links
 Main Draw (ATP)
 Official results archive (ATP)
 Official results archive (ITF)

2002 Abierto Mexicano Pegaso
Doubles